Rubicon Riders Dragon Boat Racing Team (MDBRC) is based in Montreal on the Olympic Basin located in Parc Jean-Drapeau. The RR was founded in 2011 as a competitive U23 team, the first its kind in Quebec. The boat is composed with a mixture of paddlers from Raging Beast (16), Autoboat Beast(3), Kamikaze(1), Boat Rockers (2) and Montreal Mix(2). 

On May 25, 2011, the Rubicon Riders raced for the first time as a team in H2O Open, Montreal. On July 3, the crew clinched 3rd place (18-23 category) in DBC National Competition, Welland, Ontario and has officially qualified for the IDBF Hong Kong Club Crew Championship 2012!!!

History
Founded in April 2011 with the merge of different paddlers aged from 18 to 23.

The name Rubicon Riders originated from the idiom "Crossing the Rubicon" which means to pass a point of no return.

Competition Results
Rubicon Riders is a competitive team that participates in numerous competition year round around the Greater Montreal Region and Ontario.

H2O Open 2011

Lachine KnockOut 2011

 Qualifying 200m - Heat 1: Finished with a time of 00:51,05
 Semi-Final 3 - 200m: Finished with a time of 00:52,85
 Going into the Knockout against 3 other teams (MGDM2, Barbares and Paddle Demons)

Canadian National Competition 2011
 Overall result: 3rd place in the U23 category

Achievements

2011 - 2012 season 
 Bronze Medal Winner in Canadian National Championship, U23, Welland, Ontario

2012 - 2013 season 
 1st Runner up in 2012 Club Crew World Championship, U23 Mixed 500m, Hong Kong, China
 1st Runner up in 2012 Club Crew World Championship, U23 Mixed 200m, Hong Kong, China
 2nd Runner up in 2012 Club Crew World Championship, U23 Open 500m, Hong Kong, China
 2nd Runner up in 2012 Club Crew World Championship, U23 Open 200m, Hong Kong, China

Members
Rubicon Riders are built from members of different teams whose age is or under 23 years old. Rubicon Riders recruits paddlers under 23 from all teams without discrimination.

2011-2012 Season: First Season

2012-2013 Season: Second Season

References

External links
 
 

Dragon boat racing